Ritika Goel is a Toronto-based Canadian writer, activist, professor, and family doctor known for public advocacy on social justice matters.

Early life 
Goel was born in India before emigrating to Canada.

Career and advocacy 
Goel is a family doctor who works for Inner City Health Associates and a member of the Decent Work and Health Network known for her advocacy around tax reform, and her encouragement of doctors to express solidarity with Palestinians. She is a professor at the University of Toronto's Department of Family and Community Medicine where she was named as the first faculty lead for social accountability.

Selected publications 
As a sole author:
 The Perils of Associating 'White' with 'Privilege' in the Classroom, 2021, The Conversation
 Trudeau's Brownface Is a Symptom of a Much More Dangerous Disease, 2019, The Tyee
Co-authored:

 Gary Block and Ritika Goel, A Multi-level Approach to Treating Social Risk to Health for Health Providers - Chapter 3 of: Tackling Causes and Consequences of Health Inequalities by James Matheson, John Patterson, Laura Neilson, CRC Press, 2020 ISBN 9781351013895
 Goel et al., Implementation and impact of an online tool used in primary care to improve access to financial benefits for patients: a study protocol The BMJ 2017;7:e015947

References

External links 

 Ritika Goel - Twitter

Living people
Year of birth missing (living people)
Canadian women activists
Canadian women academics
21st-century Canadian women writers
Canadian women physicians
Academic staff of the University of Toronto
Indian emigrants to Canada